Robert Jordan is an American business executive. He became the chief executive officer (CEO) of Southwest Airlines on February 1, 2022. On June 23, 2021 it was announced that he would succeed Gary C. Kelly as the sixth CEO of the company in February 2022. Previously he was Executive Vice President of Corporate Services for Southwest Airlines.

Jordan graduated from Texas A&M University with a Computer Science degree. Before joining Southwest Airlines in 1988, he worked as a programmer and financial analyst for Hewlett-Packard. During his time at Southwest, he has served in a wide variety of roles, notably previously running AirTran Airways following Southwest's acquisition of the carrier in 2011.

In December of 2022, Jordan presided over the 2022 Southwest Airlines Scheduling Crisis, where thousands of flights were cancelled the week after Christmas due to an operational systems failure.

References

Southwest Airlines people
American airline chief executives
Living people
Year of birth missing (living people)
21st-century American businesspeople
Texas A&M University alumni
Hewlett-Packard people